Robert Vaughn (1932–2016) was an American actor.

Robert Vaughn may also refer to:
Sir Robert Vaughan, 2nd Baronet (1768–1843), Welsh landowner and Member of Parliament
Robert Vaughan (minister) (1795–1868), English minister of the Congregationalist communion
Robert Vaughn (Australian politician) (1833–1908), Australian politician and member of the New South Wales Legislative Assembly.
Robert Vaughn (Montana rancher) (1836–1918), Welsh American and Montana pioneer
Bobby Vaughn (1885–1965), baseball player